The Easterners were a political faction of the Joseon dynasty. This faction appeared during the reign of Seonjo of Joseon in sixteenth-century Korea. Originating from friends of Gim Hyowon, they soon encompassed most of the disciples of Jo Sik and Yi Hwang, conflicting with Yi I and his followers, who formed the core of the Westerners. Though emerging as the dominant faction in the 1580s, it nearly collapsed at the suicide of Jeong Yeorip and the succeeding bloodshed in 1589. After Westerner Jeong Cheol was exiled for attempting to make Prince Gwanghae the Crown Prince, the Easterners divided into Northerners and Southerners.

History

Division from Sarim 
After the death of Queen Dowager Munjeong and her brother Yun Won-hyeong in the late Myeongjong (1534–1545–1567) period, the Sarim faction, which had endured four literati purges throughout the sixteenth century, came to power as the dominant political faction. At the time, the Sarim were united as a single faction. But this unity deteriorated during the reign of King Seonjo (1552-1567-1608).

In 1574, the official Kim Hyowon was nominated for the position of Ijo Jeongrang, which had the privilege of promoting scholar-officials, including the next Ijo Jeongrang. However, Sim Euigyeom, the brother of Queen Insun, opposed Kim's promotion on the grounds that Kim had often given bribes to the corrupt official Yun Wonhyeong. However, Kim was promoted.

The next year, Sim Chunggyeom, the brother of Sim Euigyeom, was nominated for the next Ijo Jeongrang. However, Kim Hyowon, who had the right to appoint his successors, claimed that Sim was unsuitable for the position because he was the brother of Queen Insun (brothers of the queen were regarded to be more corrupt, as in the Yun Wonhyeong example). Yi Bal became the next Ijo Jeongrang.

The incident resulted in a large political debate on whether Kim Hyowon's actions were just, titled the Eulhae Dangron ('factional strifes of 1575'). Supporters of Kim included Kim Uong, Yu Seongryong, Heo Yeob, Yi Sanhae, Yi Bal, Jeong Jiyeon, Wu Seongjeon, and Jeong Yugil, while major supporters of Sim were Jeong Cheol, Yun Dusu, Park Sun, Kim Kyehwi, Gu Samaeng, Hong Seongmin, and Shin Heungshi. The people who took the side of Kim became known as 'Easterners', because Kim's house was in Geoncheondong (now Inhyeon) to the east of Seoul, while the supporters of Sim, who lived in Jeongreungbang to the west of Seoul, became known as 'Westerners'. The controversy forever split the united Sarim into two opposing parties.

Most Easterners at the time of the Eulhae Dangron were younger officials, many having been officials only since the 1560s or 1570s. Moreover, they were generally students of Jo Sik or Yi Hwang. Therefore, the Easterners had a more liberal ideology.

Dispute with Yi I 
In the 1570s, the conflict between the Easterners and Westerners intensified, despite efforts by people such as Yi I or Seong Hon to reconcile the hostile groups together.

In 1575, Yi I was an advisor to Seonjo, and advised the king to send both Kim Hyowon and Sim Euigyeom as officials in faraway counties. Seonjo followed Yi's advice and sent Kim as the governor of Buryeong, a small town approximately 650 kilometers northeast of Seoul, whereas Sim was made the governor of Gaeseong, a major city 70 kilometers northwest of Seoul. This angered the Easterners, as it seemed as if Seonjo was taking Sim's side. Thus to reconcile the Easterners, Yi I claimed Kim had a serious disease, unsuitable as a governor of the far north. Seonjo then moved Kim Hyowon as a governor of Samcheok, a town slightly larger than Buryeong, 150 kilometers to the east of Seoul.

However, the Easterners, who were by far the majority in court, were not pleased that Yi I was apparently neutral in the conflict, when they believed that Sim Euigyeom had clearly wronged. However, Yi I believed that both Kim and Sim had done both good and bad things. Sim had prevented a fifth purge of the Sarim (by chasing Yi Lyang and his followers from court in 1563), while Kim had helped form a Sarim government by introducing many new scholars into the government. However, Sim had interfered in politics despite his status as a relative of the queen, while Kim had been close to Yun Wonhyeong despite his being a Seonbi. Yi I therefore believed that both sides were equal in their deeds and misdeeds.

However, Yi I believed that the fury of the Easterners had to be calmed. To do so, he wrote an advice for the king to fire Sim Euigyeom and gave it to the Easterner Jeong Inhong, asking him to not change anything in the advice. However, Jeong added the single sentence "gathers other officials to create a faction" in the list of Sim's misdeeds in the advice.

When Seonjo asked Jeong who "the other officials" were, Jeong replied that it was Jeong Cheol and the Yun Dugu brothers, who were at the time the sole Westerners in court. Yi I was angered that Jeong had changed the words of his advice, forcing Jeong to revoke his former words by saying that though Jeong Cheol had done much wrong, he did not create a faction. He then retired to his hometown, causing the Easterners to be furious at Yi I.

Both Yi I and Jeong Cheol were forced to step down, while Sim Euigyeom stayed in court. Yi I returned in the early 1580s (Jeong Cheol also returned), and in 1582 declared himself a Westerner, revoking his earlier position as a neutral observer. However, the Westerners were no match for the Easterners, thus creating a solidly Easterner government in the 1580s until Jeong Yeorip's purge.

Easterner government in the 1580s 
In 1584 Yi I died, only months after being recalled to court. Seeing Yi's death as a chance, the Easterner Yi Bal attacked Sim Euigyeom and many of the Westerners. Jeong Cheol, Seong Hon, and Sim were fired, creating a solidly Easterner government for five years until 1589. Yi I and Seong Hon were ferociously attacked by Easterners, often on the charges that they had attempted to create a faction. This was often refuted by the pupils of Yi and Seong, however they could not effectively oppose the Easterners.

The major seats in government, especially that of Yeongeuijeong (by No Susin), were taken by major Easterners. The more aggressive Westerners, such as Jo Heon, were exiled.

The Easterner government of the 1580s are often accused of increasing the damage caused by the Imjin War in the 1590s. Though controversial, mainstream historians generally believe that Yi I advised the king to prepare 100,000 soldiers against possible foreign invasions. However, this was refused by Yu Seongryong, a major leader of the Easterners, because Yu believed that raising a large army would be harsh on the populace. However, Yi's worries were exemplified in 1592, when 200,000 Japanese soldiers invaded Busan. However, there is a theory that the advice was in fact a forgery invented by Yi's pupil Kim Jang-Saeng to make Yi I look wiser and to make Yu Seongryong look foolish.

Jeong Yeorip's purge 
Jeong Yeorip was originally one of Yi I's students, and was promoted largely due to Yi's recommendations. However, Jeong grew increasingly closer to Yi Bal, a major Easterner, and by the 1580s Jeong sided with the Easterners to attack the Westerners. This caused an extreme hate of Jeong by the Westerners. The king already disliked Jeong, and Jeong was forced to retire to Jeonju.

However, even in Jeonju, Jeong remained a powerful presence due to his friendship with major Easterners, especially Yi Bal, who had a powerful influence in both the court and in the Honam region. In Jeonju, Jeong formed a slave's association called the Daedonggye (대동계, 大同契), which trained slaves archery and other ways of combat. In 1587, the Daedonggye was powerful enough to defeat a group of pirates when the Jeonju magistrate's governmental army could not.

Jeong was also an ideologue, who believed that "the world is public property, with many owners", and that "Yao and Shun became great because they gave power to the talented and not to their sons." Both ideas went against the absolute monarchism of the Joseon dynasty.

In October 1589, the Westerners Han Jun, Park Chunggan, Yi Chuk, and Han Eungin claimed that Jeong was secretly plotting to be king himself, using the Daedonggye, and that he was spreading Docham, a heretical ideology, to influence the populace. However, the validity of the claim has been disputed, especially the reason that a major Easterner like Jeong would rebel against the Easterner government.

Seonjo ordered Jeong to be brought alive. Jeong fled to the nearby Juk Island without destroying his letters or books and performed suicide. However, there is an opposing theory, suggested by the Easterners ever since the purge, that the Westerners killed Jeong and disguised his murder as suicide.

The supposed treason of Jeong created a chance for the Westerners to regain their power. Seonjo made the Westerner Jeong Cheol oversee the investigation of the treason. The Yeongeuijeong (the premier) of the time, No Susin, and the Ueuijeong, Jeong Eonsin, were exiled due to their connections with Jeong Yeorip. (Jeong did not destroy the letters sent to him when he performed suicide or was murdered, and the letters proved to be useful when searching out those who had been close to Jeong.)

One of the most influential Easterners, Yi Bal, died under torture, as did his brothers. The family of Yi had excelled in the courtly examination for eight generations, and the family was the most esteemed in Jeolla Province. Yi's eighty-year-old mother and his six-year-old son was also killed by torture a year later. Most of Yi Bal's nephews died as well.

It was also found that Jeong had claimed the existence of a more influential entity in the rebellion, named 'Gil Sambong'.  The identity or even the very existence of 'Gil Sambong' remained unknown. Though various testimonies about 'Gil Sambong' were told by Jeong Yeorip's acquaintances, the testimonies did not match at all on crucial topics such as age, height, or appearance.

While the identity of 'Gil Sambong' remained a mystery, a group of Westerners claimed that Choe Yeonggyeong, an influential scholar of Jeonju and a major Easterner, was 'Gil Sambong', because he sat at the highest seat in an archery practice held by the Daedonggye. Choe was brought before Seonjo, where he claimed that he had never had any form of connection with Jeong Yeorip. Both Seonjo and Jeong Cheol thought Choe was not 'Gil Sambong'. However, Westerner pressure forced Seonjo to continue the torture of Choe. Choe died of torture in 1590.

The purge furthered the distance between Easterners and Westerners as eternal enemies, especially as up to a thousand Easterners were killed, exiled, or fired in the purge. The deaths of Jeong Yeorip, Yi Bal, and Choe Yeonggyeong, who were all from the Honam region, caused a distaste for people from Honam within the court; this has been claimed as one of the causes of the Donghak Peasant Revolution.

Regain of Power 
In 1590, the Easterners Yi Sanhae and Yu Seongryong and the Westerner Jeong Cheol were the three State Counciliors - Samjeongseung (삼정승). At the time, Seonjo had not appointed a crown prince, although he was already nearing forty and had many sons. As his first queen was infertile he choice was to be done between the sons from concubines. The two oldest were from Lady Gong of the Gimhae Gim clan. Prince Imhae, the oldest one,  was known for stealing the properties of peasants, drinking alcohol, and being friends with gangsters. In contrast, the second-oldest son, Prince Gwanghae, was known for his intelligence and skill. Therefore, most of the officials believed that Gwanghae should be the Crown Prince.

However, Yi Sanhae knew that Seonjo was much closer to Lady In of the Suwon Gim clan and her eldest son, Prince Sinseong, than to either Imhae or Gwanghae. Yi also knew that both Jeong Cheol and Yu Seongryong wanted Gwanghae as crown prince. Finally, Yi was also aware that Yu had a cautious nature, while Jeong did not.

Yi Sanhae so decided to bring down Jeong Cheol and the Westerners. He told Kim Gongryang, the brother of Lady In, that Jeong was planning to kill Lady In and Prince Sinseong, right after he had made Gwanghae the Crown Prince. Kim told Yi's story to Lady In, who in turn told it to Seonjo.

Meanwhile, the Easterners Yu Seongryong, Yi Sanhae, and Yi Seongjung and the Westerner Jeong Cheol promised each other that they would ask Seonjo to make Gwanghae Crown Prince together. However, Yi Sanhae did not appear at the promised date (he claimed he was ill). Yu Seongryong was too cautious to bring the subject up, and Jeong Cheol was the first to advise Seonjo to make Gwanghae Crown Prince. When Jeong Cheol brought the matter up, Seonjo was infuriated, believing that the story told by Lady In was true. Seonjo exiled Jeong Cheol and fired Westerners such as the Yun Dusu brothers, recreating a solidly Easterner government.

Meanwhile, in 1590 (when the Easterners regained power), the warlord Toyotomi Hideyoshi unified Japan, ending the Sengoku period. He had already been the most powerful figure in the archipelago since 1583. Toyotomi wanted to conquer the Ming China, using Korea as the main route, and in 1587 he asked the Joseon Kingdom for a safe route. This was refused.

Nevertheless, Toyotomi continuously asked the Joseon Kingdom to open such a route. Seonjo, worried about a possible war with a unified Japan, sent the Easterner Kim Seongil and the Westerner Hwang Yungil to Japan as envoys. The Seonjo Sillok, compiled by Easterners during the reign of King Gwanghae, says that Hwang accepted so many gifts from Japan that his "pockets were full of money", while Kim refused to accept any form of gift.

When the envoys returned to Joseon, Hwang said that Toyotomi was "strong and fierce", and that it was almost certain that Japan would invade. Kim, however, said that Toyotomi was like a "cowardly rat" and that he would not invade. According to the Easterner Yu Seongryong in his Jingbirok, the reason for Kim's saying that Japan would not invade was to stop the people from being frightened or rioting. Because Kim was an Easterner, and because Easterners were in power at the time, the court did not prepare for war. However, Hwang proved ultimately correct, as Toyotomi invaded Busan with 200,000 soldiers in 1592, and the unprepared government collapsed at the onslaught.

Division into Northerners and Southerners 

Jeong Cheol was fired with most of the Westerners in 1590, the Easterners differed on whether they should kill or just exile Jeong. Most of the Easterners who wanted to kill Jeong lived near Mount Bukak (translated to the Northern rock), while most of the Easterners who opposed killing Jeong lived near Mount Nam (translated to the Southern mountain). The location caused those who wanted Jeong's death to be called the 'Northerners', while those who opposed his death became called 'Southerners'.

However, the dispute on whether Jeong should die or not was the sole, or even the most influential, cause of the split. The students of Jo Sik had suffered terrible damages by Jeong Yeorip's purge, while the followers of Yi Hwang had not lost anyone. Moreover, Yu Seongryong, the most influential of Yi Hwang's students, retained a close relationship with Jeong Cheol, who led the purge. Thus, Jo Sik's students wanted to kill Jeong Cheol more than Yu Seongryong and other students of Yi Hwang did. Another cause for division was that Jeong Inhong, the most favored student of Jo Sik, had a contempt for Yi Hwang and his pupils, who formed a large part of the Easterners. These differences within the Easterner camp led to the followers of Yi Hwang becoming largely Southerners, while the followers of Jo Sik became largely Northerners.

By 1598, the split of the Easterners had become apparent, with Southerners such as Yu Seongryong being attacked by Northerners such as Yi Yicheom. However, the Northerners were still closer to the Southerners than to the Westerners, and after the Westerners gained power in 1623, most of the surviving Northerners were absorbed by the Southerners.

Ideology 
The ideologies of the Easterners were very diverse, including pupils of Jo Sik, Yi Hwang, and Seo Gyeongdeok. The people who formed the Easterners were largely of the Yeongnam School of philosophy, which included Jo Sik and Yi Hwang. By contrast, the majority of the Westerners were of the Giho School of Yi Yi and Seong Hon. Later, as the Nammyeong School collapsed, the phrase 'Yeongnam School' became synonymous with the Toegye School.

The Yeongnam School was divided into four:
 The Yeong School was the oldest of the four, holding Kim Jongjik as the founder. It was also the school that formed the basis for the other three schools. It held that Li, a concept of rationality in Chinese philosophy, was neither superior nor inferior to Qi, the material. The Yeong School formed the Sarim's philosophical basis.
 The Nammyeong School, founded by Jo Sik, were the school of philosophy in Southern Gyeongsang. The Nammyeong School disliked debates and discussions and emphasized action above discussion. The Nammyeong School were the majority of the Northerners. The School was destroyed with the execution of Jeong Inhong, Jo's best student, in 1623, and most of the survivors were absorbed into the Toegye School, just as in politics the Northerners were absorbed by the Southerners.
 The Toegye School, founded by Yi Hwang, believed that Li (rationality) was absolute, while Qi (material) was relative (this, however, does not mean that they believed that the Li was in any way superior to the Qi). They also believed that the Li and the Qi were completely different, and that the human ethics were Li (rational), while the human emotions were Qi (material). The latter idea was attacked by Yi I, who believed that ethics were just a positive side of the emotions. The Toegye School were the majority of the Southerners, and remained the contender of the Giho School to the eighteenth century.
 The Yeohyeon School of Jang Hyeongang is often considered a Toegye offshoot. He believed that Li was equal to Qi, and that ethics were also an emotion. Jang himself remained very close to Yi Hwang's pupils, and his students generally came to follow the Toegye School.

Legacy 

After the Easterner division, the Northerners gained power, and they themselves divided into the Greater Northerners (of, among others, Jeong Inhong) and the Lesser Northerners (of, among others, Yu Yeonggyeong). The two Northerners battled throughout the last years of the Seonjo reign and the entire of the Gwanghaegun reign, though the Greater Northerners gained the upper hand with the imprisonment of Queen Inmok in 1618. However, the Northerner government was brought down when Gwanghaegun of Joseon was brought down by a coup from Prince Neungyang and the Westerners. Despite efforts by Nam Iung to revive the Northerners, they soon joined the Southerners.

Meanwhile, the Southerners remained an unimportant faction until the Hyeonjong era, when the Yesong debate enabled the Southerners to gain power in 1674, the first time that the Southerners were a majority in the government. The Southerners ruled as a majority faction until 1680, when the Gyeongsin Hwanguk occurred, killing prominent Southerners such as Heo Jeok, Yun Hyu, and Yu Hyeokhyeon.

However, in 1689, the Southerner concubine Lady Huibin Jang delivered Sukjong's first son, causing Sukjong to change the Westerner government into a Southerner one.
However, the Southerner government was changed to a Westerner government again in 1694, and the Southerners never gained power again.

Family tree of Korean political factions

Notes

References 

Joseon dynasty
Political history of Korea